EuroWordNet is a system of semantic networks for European languages, based on WordNet. Each language develops its own wordnet but they are interconnected with interlingual links stored in the Interlingual Index (ILI). 

Unlike the original Princeton WordNet, most of the other wordnets are not freely available.

Languages
The original EuroWordNet project dealt with Dutch, Italian, Spanish, German, French, Czech, and Estonian.  These wordnets are now frozen, but wordnets for other languages have been developed to varying degrees.

License 
Some examples of EuroWordNet are available for free. Access to the full database, however, is charged. In some cases, OpenThesaurus and BabelNet may serve as a free alternative.

See also 

 vidby
 Babbel

External links 

Lexical databases
Computational linguistics
Online dictionaries